The governor of Bulacan is the local chief executive of the province of Bulacan in Central Luzon region of the country. The governor holds office at the Bulacan Provincial Capitol in Malolos City.

List of governors of Bulacan

References 

 
Government of Bulacan
Governors of provinces of the Philippines
Politics of Bulacan